Indians in Council, California is an 1872 oil landscape painting by the Hudson River School artist Albert Bierstadt. The painting was made amidst Bierstadt's Yosemite and Sierra Nevada work, while he was residing in California. He felt Native American life was "rapidly passing away", and it was an artist's duty to "tell...their history".

References

Paintings by Albert Bierstadt
Paintings in the collection of the Smithsonian American Art Museum
Native Americans in art
1872 paintings